The Guayupe are an Arawak-speaking indigenous group of people in modern-day Colombia. They inhabit the westernmost parts of the department of Meta. At the time of the Spanish conquest, more than 250,000 Guayupe were living in large parts of Meta.

Knowledge of the Guayupe has been provided by Pedro de Aguado and others.

Guayupe territory 
The territory of the Guayupe before the Spanish conquest stretched from the rivers Upía and Guayabero to the peaks of the Eastern Ranges of the Colombian Andes. The Guayupe lived mostly around the Ariari River.

Municipalities belonging to Guayupe territories

Description 
The first report on the Guayupe nation is from German conquistador Philipp von Hutten, participant of the expedition led by Georg Hohermuth von Speyer from Coro in Venezuela to the  borders of the Amazon bassin (1535 - 1538). He describes them as "very good looking people and very able in defending themselves." Indeed, Hohermuths army never was able to make peace with the Guayupe, crossing their entire land from the northern shores of Upía river down to the regions south of the Guaviare river.  On their way, the conquistadors were engaged in various skirmishes and even in a big battle with the Guayupe warriors. "They tried their luck on us frequently but although they killed and wounded many of us, we always gave them the rawer deal. This nation fights with bow and arrow and spears and shields made of tapir skin, and they throw gins." The Germans were not the very first Europeans to encounter the Guayupe. Near the Guaviare river they found some items of clearly european origin. As they knew later, it were belongings of an expedition led by Alonso de Herrera, who likely came up the Guaviare river with boats. In 1934, the Guayupe "had slaughtered 90 of Herrera's men and the survivors escaped downstream. In Coro, we met some of them."

The Guayupe are a tribe of farmers living in the tropical mountain forests of the Eastern Ranges and the Llanos of Meta, Colombia. In pre-Columbian times they constructed pallisades around their villages consisting of houses around a central square with a ceremonial building in the middle. Because of the sophisticated defence works including palisades, thorn bushes and well-camouflaged pitfalls, the Spanish soldiers in Hohermuth's army nicknamed one of those well fortified villages "Little Salses", referring to the Catalan Fort de Salses, an innovative type of fortress at this time. The Guayupe were an agricultural society with yuca one of their main crops. The Guayupe people went naked, only ornamented with gold, feathers and shells.

The Guayupe society was organised around the caciques; chiefs of the community. The cacique was regarded as an important person who lived by strict norms in the ceremonial activities; births, marriages and burials. When a cacique of the Guayupe died, the body was cremated and his successor had to drink his ash mixed with chicha. The society of the Guayupe was egalitarian; caciques only had the use of stools and more feathers on their blankets. At every marriage, half of the bride treasure was going to the cacique.

They built canoes of wood and consumed yuca and casabe, fish and meat. They didn't eat bird meat.

According to scholar Pedro de Aguado, the Guayupe defecated in the rivers around and not near their houses.

Religion 
As in the Muisca religion, the main gods were the Sun and the Moon who were husband and wife. The supreme being of the Guayupe, in the Muisca religion called Chiminigagua, was Inaynagui.

The products the Guayupe used in their rituals were coca and tobacco. Cannibalism is not reported of the Guayupe.

Modern age 
In 1996, fifteen ceramic pots were found, pertaining to the Guayupe culture. In 2011, after the excavation of a Guayupe burial site, the museum of the Guayupe in Fuente de Oro was opened, containing bones, burial urns, artefacts and plates.

See also 

Muisca
Achagua, Tegua, Sutagao

References

Bibliography 
 
 
 
 
Fray Pedro Aguado. Recopilación Historial, Parte 2, Vol. III. Bogotá 1957.
Eberhard Schmitt, Friedrich Karl von Hutten (ed.): Das Gold der Neuen Welt. Die Papiere des Welser-Konquistadors und Generalkapitäns von Venezuela Philipp von Hutten 1534–1541. 2., neubearb. Aufl. Verlag Spitz, Berlin 1999, ISBN 3-87061-862-0.

Further reading 
 

Indigenous peoples in Colombia
Colombian culture